The 1938–39 Bradford City A.F.C. season was the 32nd in the club's history.

The club finished 3rd in Division Three North, and reached the 1st round of the FA Cup.

Sources

References

Bradford City A.F.C. seasons
Bradford City